Lienchiang County is represented in the Legislative Yuan since 2008 by one at-large single-member constituency (Lienchiang County Constituency).

Current district
 Lienchiang County

Legislators

Election results

2020

2016

References 

Constituencies in Taiwan
Matsu Islands